The Captivity of Nairs at Seringapatam was imposed on the Nairs of Malabar by Tipu Sultan, the de facto ruler of the Kingdom of Mysore from 1786 to 1799. They were subjected to forcible conversions to Sunni Islam, the official religious sect sanctioned by the Ottoman Caliphate, whose approval and alliance was sought by Tippu Sultan. Those who refused conversions had to face many humiliations, hardships, torture, and even death. The Nairs were treated with extreme brutality due to their strong adherence to the Hindu faith and martial tradition. The captivity ended when Nair troops from Travancore defeated Tipu in the Third Anglo-Mysore War. It is estimated that out of the 30,000 Nairs put to captivity (including women and children), only a few hundred returned to Malabar alive.

North Malabar was divided into the Nair principalities of Chirakkal, Kadattanad, Kottayam, Kurangod and the Moplah principality of Cannanore which owed nominal allegiance to Chirakkal. South Malabar was divided between the Zamorin of Calicut and the Raja of Cochin.

Nairs under Hyder Ali
The period of Sultan of Mysore Hyder Ali’s conquest of Malabar between 1766 and 1793 was met with stiff opposition from the local Nairs. In 1766, he marched into Palakkad and Malabar, followed by another march into Malabar via Thamarassery ghat in 1767. Hyder quickly understood the Nair psyche and caste pride and decided to use it to facilitate conversions. To this end, he deprived Nairs of caste privileges, equating them to Paravas, prohibited them from carrying arms, and outlawed them. Furthermore, he offered privileges back to anybody who converted to Islam. This forced some Nairs and many members of the Hindu community to adopt Islam, and resulted in the first appearance of Islam in the Malabar countryside. Humiliated by these perceived slights imposed by the Sultan, the Nairs rose in rebellion. They harassed isolated block-houses set up by Hyder, raided, pillaged, and destroyed stores and munition dumps.

Ayaz Khan was a Nair from Chirakkal who had been taken prisoner by Hyder during the latter's Malabar campaign of 1766. He became a Muslim and was enlisted in the Asad-i-Ilahi (new converts) troops. Finding favour with Hyder Ali, in 1779 he became Governor of Chitaldroog and in 1782 of Bednur. The British approached him and he rejected their overtures, but after Hyder's death he agreed to support them and handed over Bednur to them.

Nairs under Tipu Sultan

Related Letters

In his letter to the Governor of Bekal, Budruz Zaman Khan, in the year 1200 AH (1785 AD), Tipu approved of forced conversions of Nairs:

In May of the same year, an order was sent to the Faujdar of Calicut, Arshad Ali Baig, pertaining to the treatment of a Nair dissident:

Proclamation
In 1788, Tipu issued a proclamation to the Nairs of Malabar, wherein he outlined his new scheme of social reform.

His proclamation was met with widespread resentment and consequently, the Hindus of Malabar rose in rebellion. Due to fear 30,000 Brahmins fled to Travancore. The Kottayam and Kadattanand Rajas sought protection from the English East India Company. In November 1788, Tipu's forces attacked Calicut and captured the Karanavappad of Manjeri. Their assaults were met with resistance by the Nairs of Calicut and southern Malabar led by Ravi Varma and other princes of the Padinjare Kovilakam. Tipu set 6,000 troops under his French commander, M. Lally to raise the siege, but failed to defeat Ravi Varma.

Captives

The following year in 1789 Tipu sent Gulam Ali, Gaji Khan and Darvedil Khan with troops into Coorg by way of Siddhesvara. where they took up strong positions, seized grain, men, women and children while burning houses that they pillaged. They set fire to the Padinalkanadu temple. Later the 'Maleyalam' (Malabar region) people joined the Coorgs. Tipu sent Gulam Ali into Malabar but en route Gulam was attacked by the Coorgs. Gulam managed to reach Malabar where he burnt down the Payyavur temple and attacked that region.

That same year (1789), when Tipu was marching against the Nairs at Calicut who had become rebellious, he heard of another rebellion in Coorg. He sent a force towards Coorg under Burhan ud Din and Sayed Hamid. Tipu himself crossed the Tamarasseri(Tamrachadi) Ghat and entered Malabar region. There he ordered some of the inhabitants to be converted (made Asadulai), placed Officer Ghafar in command there and had a wooden fort or stockade built.

Tipu had halted in the Malabar to enforce his proclamation. General orders were issued to his army that 'every being in the district without distinction should be burned, that they should be traced to their lurking places, and that all means of truth and falsehood, force or fraud should be employed to effect their universal conversion'. The Raja of Cherkal (Chirakkal, Kannur) fled to Tellicherry but when he was intercepted he killed himself. Then his body was dragged round the camp and hung from a tree. Tipu besieged the Kadattanad Raja's fortified palace at Kuttipuram, and 2,000 Nairs—forced to surrender after a resistance of several days. Several Rajas and wealthy land owners fled to Travancore, where the Dharma Raja helped them to rehabilitate themselves in their new surroundings. On the other hand, Nairs retreated into the jungles where they engaged in guerrilla warfare against the invading Mysorean army.
Tipu further organised a regular and systematic hunt for Nairs. He then proceeded to Cannanore and after celebrating the marriage of his son with the daughter of the Ali Raja, marched along the coast of Chowghat. He then made arrangements for the administrative reorganisation of the province, and retired to Coimbatore, leaving a permanent occupying force to frighten and subjugate the local population.

See also
 Mysorean invasion of Kerala
 Captivity of Mangalorean Catholics at Seringapatam
 Captivity of Kodavas at Seringapatam

Citations

References

 .
 .
.
 .
 .
 .
 .
 .
 .
 .
 .
 .
 .

Islam-related controversies in Asia
Conversion to Islam
Persecution by Muslims
Persecution of Hindus
Mysorean invasion of Malabar
Ethnic cleansing in Asia